Ali Maqseed is a Kuwaiti football midfielder. He plays left back or left wing with many other positions for Al Arabi SC in VIVA Premier League and the Kuwait national football team.

Ali first joined the first-team when he was 18 years old.

Maqseed is well known for his talented dribbling and speed, due to that he is nicknamed  "Al-Janah Al-Ta'ier"  (The Flying Wing). Ali Himself has rejected all offers from other clubs around the world staying loyal for his club.

Ali started playing for the Kuwait national football team in 2008, but initially he never got to play a lot.

Ali played for Al-Arabi in the 2007 AFC Champions League group stage.

Maqseed has one son named Haidar.

On October 29, 2015 he was nominated for UAFA Arabian Footballer of the Year 2015 with Mohamed Salah and Asian Player of the Year 2015.

Professional career

Al-Arabi

2005-06
Ali was called up to the first team while he was still young in age (18 Years). Later that season he made his debut for the club vs Al-Sahel SC and played 8 other matches later that season. although the club lost Al-Kurafi Cup Final. He later won the Kuwait Emir Cup after beating Qadsia SC 2-0,Ali Played his first final in his career giving Ali his First Professional Club title with Al-Arabi.  

Maqseed was later named Al-Arabi SC best U-23 player of the year. Although he didn't play a lot with the first-team he played most of the season with the reserves in the reserves League. Many other Newspapers started naming him the best dribbler Kuwait would see in years.

Before the final few weeks to the end of the season he was in Al-Arabi's 2006 AFC Champions League Squad but didn't play due to injury.

At the end of the season the club extended Maqaseed's contract for 6 more years with the club.

2006-07
After returning from injury Maqseed was the main option for the team as a first-team player.

Throughout the season Maqseed was selected for Al-Arabi SC best U-23 player of the year again.

On February 22, 2007 he played his first Kuwait Crown Prince Cup Final which Al-Arabi won 1-0 vs Kazma gave him his first Crown Prince trophy and 2nd Trophy with the club.

He was later called up for 2007 AFC Champions League Squad he played his first match against Zawra.2007 AFC Champions League group stage.

2007-08
He scored in 2007-08  Kuwait Emir Cup Final at half time but the game was stopped due to the sheikh died between the game. The game was played again after 1 week Al-Arabi beat Al-Salmiya SC 2-1 giving him his 3rd title.

2008-09
After the FA announced the new Kuwait Super Cup which was played by Al-Arabi vs Kuwait SC the match ended 1-0 and he won his 4th Title in his career.

VIVA Premier League team of the week 16 

On October 29, 2015 Nominated for UAFA Arabian Footballer of the Year 2015

International career

International goals
Scores and results list Kuwait's goal tally first.

Honours

Club
Al-Arabi SC
Kuwait Emir Cup: 2005–06, 2007–08, 2019-20
Kuwait Crown Prince Cup: 2006–07, 2011–12, 2013–14
Kuwait Super Cup: 2008, 2012
Kuwait Federation Cup: 2013–14

International
Gulf Cup of Nations: 2010

Individual
UAFA Arabian Footballer of the Year 2015: Nominated
Asian Player of the Year 2015: Top Nomination
VIVA Premier League 1st phase Team: 2015–16

References

External-Links

1986 births
Living people
Kuwaiti footballers
2011 AFC Asian Cup players
2015 AFC Asian Cup players
Footballers at the 2010 Asian Games
Sportspeople from Kuwait City
Kuwait international footballers
Association football fullbacks
Association football wingers
Association football utility players
Al-Arabi SC (Kuwait) players
Asian Games competitors for Kuwait
Kuwait Premier League players